Toine Hermsen may refer to:

 Toine Hermsen (chef) - Michelin starred chef, owner of the restaurant with his name
 Toine Hermsen (restaurant) - Dutch restaurant with one Michelin star (formerly two)